Thunderlip is a rock & roll band from Wilmington, North Carolina.

Thunderlip began in 2003. They started off playing shows locally in 2004, and quickly got picked up by Lucid Records (now defunct) and put out their "S/T" release in June 2005. They toured heavily on this release and the record peaked to No. 90 on the CMJ charts. Through extensive tours they landed clothing and shoe endorsements from Matix Clothing and DVS Shoes. They were also endorsed by Vestal Watch and Electric Visual. They played many surf expos, and in late 2005 they were voted best metal band by Fuel TV. They continued touring on the S/T release throughout most of 2006, and in early 2007 they tracked their second release The Prophecy. This was also released by Lucid Records. They did several tours for this record, including the Props Visual Road Fools BMX tour (which included such riders as Mat Hoffman, Mike Aitken, and Chase Hawk). The tour also included Lucero, and was sponsored by Levi's. The band slowed down in early 2009 and later that year founding member/guitarist James Yopp joined another North Carolina based band Valient Thorr, eventually leading to a long-term hiatus for Thunderlip. The hiatus ended in late 2012 when The band re-grouped to begin working on new material. In December 2013 original members Chuck Krueger, Johnny Collins, James Yopp and new guitarist Johnny Yeagher recorded a new album titled Sunday Driving, later self released in 2015. On January 14, 2018, they announced, "We’re taking a bunch of months off to write and record some songs..." via Facebook.

Band members
Chuck Krueger (vocals)
James Yopp (guitar)
Duane Mayhew (drums)
John Manning (guitar)
Victor Marriot (bass)

Past members
Johnny Collins (drums)
Johnny Yeagher (guitar)
Kenny Ells (bass)
Ben Lanier (drums)
Brandon Autrey (bass)

Discography
 Thunderlip (Lucid Records, 2005)
 The Prophecy (Lucid Records, 2007)
 Sunday Driving (self released, 2015)

References

External links
Thunderlip Myspace
Thunderlip's Label - Lucid Records
Thunderlip FB Page

Heavy metal musical groups from North Carolina
Musical groups established in 2004
American hard rock musical groups